Congolese Civil War or Congo War may refer to any of a number of armed conflicts in present-day countries of Republic of the Congo and the Democratic Republic of the Congo in Western Africa:

In the historic Kingdom of Kongo:
Kongo Civil War (1665–1709)
In the Republic of the Congo (formerly known as Congo-Brazzaville):
Republic of the Congo Civil War (1993–1994)
Republic of the Congo Civil War (1997–1999)
In the Democratic Republic of the Congo (formerly known as Congo-Léopoldville, Congo-Kinshasa, or Zaire):
Congo Crisis (1960–1965), dating from the country's independence from Belgium to the rise of dictator Mobutu Sese Seko
Kwilu rebellion (1963–1965)
Simba rebellion (1964), subconflict of the Congo Crisis
First Congo War (1996–1997), which led to the overthrow of Mobutu by Laurent-Désiré Kabila and his rebels
Second Congo War (1998–2003), involved nine nations and led to ongoing low-level warfare despite an official peace treaty and the first democratic elections in 2006
Ituri conflict (1999–2007), a subconflict of the Second Congo War
Effacer le tableau (2002–2003), a genocide of Mbuti and other Pygmy tribes by the Movement for the Liberation of the Congo in North Kivu
FRPI/FPJC insurgency (2008–2011)
Renewed Hema-Lendu conflict (2017-present) 
Kivu conflict (2004–present)
M23 rebellion (2012–2013)
Allied Democratic Forces insurgency (2013-present)

See also 
Dongo conflict (2009)
Congolese (disambiguation)

Disambiguation pages